is a Japanese football player for Machida Zelvia.

Career
After playing for the football team of Meiji University, Doi joined Machida Zelvia in late 2017.

Club statistics
Updated to 29 August 2018.

References

External links

Profile at J. League
Profile at Machida Zelvia

1996 births
Living people
Association football people from Saitama Prefecture
Japanese footballers
J2 League players
FC Machida Zelvia players
Association football midfielders